Saurauia punduana is a species of plant in the Actinidiaceae family. It is endemic to China.

References

Endemic flora of China
punduana
Critically endangered plants
Taxonomy articles created by Polbot